This article lists notable films related to the Vietnam War.

Post-war films
After the Vietnam War ended in 1975, there was an increase in American films that were more "raw", containing actual battle footage. A FilmReference.com article noted that American filmmakers "appeared more confident to put Vietnam combat on screen for the first time" during that era. These American post-war film representations have generally been more realistic and gritty, such as The Deer Hunter (1978) and Apocalypse Now (1979).

There were several broad stereotypes about American Vietnam veterans. One stereotype were thinly disguised versions of the real Lieutenant William Calley, notorious as the officer responsible for the My Lai massacre of 1968, the so-called "psycho vet" who were portrayed as bloodthirsty psychopaths who wreak havoc upon their return to the United States. Such portrayals of the "psycho vet", while acknowledging atrocities in Vietnam, most notably blamed the atrocities upon one deranged individual, suggesting that the atrocities, at least by Americans, were aberrations in the war. Films that portrayed the "psycho vet" archetype mostly took place in the United States and the victims of the "psycho vet" were usually his fellow Americans rather than the Vietnamese. A more popular stereotype was the "wounded veteran", a veteran who was always psychologically and sometimes physically traumatized by the war. The character of Nick Chevotarevich in The Deer Hunter, a once promising young man who as a result of his war experiences is reduced down to obsessively and hopelessly playing Russian roulette for the amusement of sadistic Vietnamese gamblers in Saigon despite the manifest dangers to himself is one of the best known examples of the "wounded vet" stereotype. Chevotarevich was drafted into the Army in 1968 and throughout the film is portrayed as a victim, a man who was just incapable of overcoming the damage done to his soul by the war. Another example of the "wounded vet" archetype was the embittered and paralyzed veteran Luke Martin in the 1978 film Coming Home, whose suffering is redeemed by his winning the love of a good woman, Sally Hyde, the wife of a Marine. The British scholar Eben Muse noted in contrast to Luke, Sally's husband, Bob Hyde, is portrayed as a killer who enjoys the war and commits suicide after the war ends, suggesting veterans "...may either be an innocent or a killer, but not both".

Another stereotype was that of "the innocent", which portrayed the war as a sort of ghastly coming-of-age ritual for young American men, who provided that they're survived became real men. An example of the "innocent" stereotype 'is the character of Chris in the 1986 film Platoon.  Chris is a naïve and innocent young man who joins the Army in 1967 out of a sense of patrotism. At the beginning of the film, Chris can barely take care of himself; by the end of the film, Chris is no longer an innocent, but has become a man. Through Chris has lost his innocence, the film suggests that this is a necessary part of growing up to become a man. Another example of the "innocent" stereotype was in the 1987 film Full Metal Jacket, where an young man, J.T. Davis, aka "Joker", joins the Marine Corps in 1966. The first half of the film concerns training at Parris island, where an inept and overweight trainee,  Leonard Lawrence, is brutally bullied, humiliated and hazed until he commits suicide. The second half of the film is set in the Battle of Hue in 1968, where the Marines fight to retake Hue, and the film climaxes with an extended scene where an unseen Viet Cong sniper kills a number of men in a Marine squad "Joker" is attached to. The film ends with "Joker" coldly executing the sniper, a badly wounded woman who begs for mercy. Joker in his closing narration notes that he has finally become a Marine and hence a man. Muse noted that both stories in Full Metal Jacket that made up Joker's quest were full of repulsive elements and imagery, but argued the film justifies the brutality of these stories. Lawrence, the "disgusting fatboy" as he is labelled "clearly needed some sense beaten into him" even if the methods employed against him were excessive while the female Viet Cong sniper had just killed a number of men in Joker's squad and her execution might be seen as a mercy killing as she was unlikely to survive her wounds.

Another stereotype was that of the "warrior" who finds his purpose in the Vietnam war despite all of its dangers and horrors. The films featuring the "warrior" tended to be set in what Muse called the "land of Nam", a "romance wasteland" portrayed in the films that was different from the real country of Vietnam. Muse wrote: "These movies portray the Land of Nam as a cruel, brutal landscape, littered with mutilated bodies and booby-traps, a place where even the women are rigged with explosives. It is a land in which no limits are placed upon aggression or violence unless by the individual soldier...In the Land of Nam, the soldier can learn to control his base nature, gain the "innocence that changes"; but he can fail to do so and become another Lieutenant Calley. The Land of Nam is a proving ground for the masculine self". Muse wrote that the films set in the "land of Nam" were not really about the Vietnam war per se, but rather were about struggles to define American masculinity with the Vietnam war just providing an exotic settling for these tests for masculinity. Because the Vietnam war was a lost war for the United States, the war is remembered in America as an especially awful conflict where the sufferings and losses were not redeemed by victory in the end as was the case with World War Two.

In the 1980s, a popular genre of Vietnam-related films were revenge fantasies that featured a Vietnam veteran or veterans returning to Vietnam to vanquish the Vietnamese, of which the most popular was the 1985 film Rambo: First Blood Part II. The American historian John Hellman noted that such revenge fantasies were an American version of the Dolchstoßlegende (the "stab-in-the-back legend" that Germany actually won World War One, but was "stabbed in the back" in 1918), minus the anti-Semitism of the original Dolchstoßlegende. In Rambo, brave soldiers such as the fictional character John Rambo were portrayed as more than capable of winning the war as Rambo is portrayed as killing hundreds of Vietnamese single-handedly and also takes out an entire Soviet Spetsnaz squad, but were "stabbed in the back" by spineless politicians who were incapable of standing up to an alleged leftish-dominated and "anti-American" media. Through Rambo is set in 1985, the film's message is that the Vietnam war was a war that the United States could, should and would had won had it not been for the "stab-in-the-back" by American leftists. Reinforcing the film's pro-war message is the portrayal of the relationship between the Soviet characters and the Vietnamese characters as the latter are portrayed as clearly subordinate to the former, suggesting that Communist Vietnam is a sort of Soviet colony, and the claim made during the war that the North Vietnamese were just Soviet puppets was indeed correct. At one point in the film, a character says that Vietnam is "hell", but that this "hell" is "home" to Rambo. Muse noted that the connection made in the film between masculinity and militarism as Rambo's efficiency as a soldier marks him out as an especially noble example of American masculinity who flourishes in the "hell" that is Vietnam.

The American scholar Gina Marchetti noted a tendency for American films and television when dealing with the Bụi đời children to "annihilate the mothers". Marchetti wrote in nearly all American productions, the Vietnamese mothers of these children are either dead or ended up dying while the exclusive responsibility of raising these children falls upon their American fathers, who were almost always white men. Marchetti wrote that "...these narratives allow their American heroes another opportunity to fight the Vietnam war and win this time, by staking a patriarchal blood claim to Vietnam's children. The absorption of the Amerasian children of war into America argues against any residual charge of American racism, cruelty or heartlessness". Marchetti wrote the domestic dramas dealing with the war's aftermath often used the story of the "boat people", the mainly ethnic Chinese refugees who fled Vietnam following the 1979 Sino-Vietnamese war, which led to a violent anti-Chinese mood in Vietnam, as a way of proving the justice of the Vietnam war. In Vietnam, like all of the other nations of Southeast Asia, the huaren (ethnic Chinese) made up a disproportionate number of the middle-class people, and were widely disliked for their success in business and the professions. When Vietnam's ancient archenemy China invaded in February 1979, anti-Chinese feelings in Vietnam boiled over, leading to the mass exodus of Vietnam's huaren who fled across the South China Sea in makeshift boats, hence the term "boat people".

The picture presented of the "boat people" in American films was of grateful refugees coming to live the American Dream. Marchetti wrote: "However, these dramas do not deal with the real problems of the Indochinese diaspora...Ironically, these stories do not use the Vietnamese refugee as a central protagonist. Rather, the American "white knight" war veteran, victimized by some unspeakable angst, linked to his involvement in the war, becomes the central hero of the tale". Marchetti wrote these narratives by focusing on doomed interracial romances between the American "white knight" and a Vietnamese women served to both justify the war and to present the problems of the war's legacy as being more solvable as these stories almost end with the  Bụi đời children coming to America to live a better life.

In the 1985 film The Lady from Yesterday, the protagonist is not the Vietnamese refugee of the film's title, but rather her former American lover, Craig Weston, a Vietnam veteran turned wealthy executive. Craig is married to the daughter of his overbearing boss, Jim, who bullies him and is portrayed as having borderline incestuous feelings for his daughter. In contrast to Craig's controlling wife, Janet, Craig's Vietnamese lover Lien who has arrived in Texas as a boat person refugee together with her son by Craig, is portrayed as the "Lotus Blossom" archetype, namely the submissive, frail, docile and highly eroticized Asian beauty. With Lien's encouragement, Craig becomes the warrior he was once was in Vietnam and he learns to stand up to both wife and his father-in-law. Through the film strongly suggests that Craig might actually be happier with Lien rather than with Janet, in the end, Lien conveniently dies, allowing Craig to go back to his white wife who adopts Craig's son by Lien. Marchetti described The Lady From Yesterday as a modern reworking of Madame Butterfly, where a white man has a passionate romance with a Lotus Blossom character, who dies in order to allow him to marry or stay married to a white woman.

Theatrical films about the Vietnam War

Theatrical films about the Vietnam War POWs

Theatrical films about the anti-Vietnam War movement

Theatrical films about Vietnam War veterans

Theatrical films about Vietnam War MIAs

Theatrical films about the Indochina refugee crisis

Television films about the Vietnam War

Television films about Vietnam War veterans

Documentary films

Documentary TV series

See also
:Category:Vietnam War films
List of Vietnam War games

References

Further reading

 
Lists of films by genre
Vietnam War